Panton Hill is a town in Victoria, Australia, 32 km north-east of Melbourne's Central Business District, located within the Shire of Nillumbik local government area. Panton Hill recorded a population of 1,063 at the 2021 census.

History

Originally called Kingstown, the area experienced population growth in the mid-1850s during the Victorian gold rush when prospectors mined the hills around the town known as the Caledonia Goldfields.

It was named after Joseph Anderson Panton, who was the magistrate at Heidelberg and spent much of his spare time mapping the Yarra Valley.

Panton Hill Post Office opened on 1 October 1875.

The Panton Hill Primary School, number 1134, was originally a two (2) room building with the Headmasters residence beside it.

Today

The town has a hotel, general store/post office, an Australian rules football club called the Panton Hill Redbacks, competing in the Northern Football League and a cricket club in the Diamond Valley Cricket Association, with 4 senior teams and 4 junior teams. It is also home to a small church, St. Matthews Anglican Church,() and several wineries including Panton Hill Winery.

Panton Hill Primary School has an enrolment of approximately 150. The nearest high schools are Diamond Valley Secondary College and Eltham College of Education. Panton Hill also has a volunteer Country Fire Brigade that services Panton Hill and the surrounding areas. A park in the centre of town has been dedicated to the memory of 5 of Panton Hill's firefighters who perished on Ash Wednesday. Panton Hill Primary School's houses are named after these firefighters.

A mobile library service operated by Yarra Plenty Regional Library regularly visits the township.

See also
 Shire of Eltham – Panton Hill was previously within this former local government area.

References

External links

 Australian Dictionary of Biography
Panton Hill, Victorian Places

Towns in Victoria (Australia)
Shire of Nillumbik